Badri Latif (born 2 November 1977) is a German field hockey player. She was born in Berlin. She won a gold medal at the 2004 Summer Olympics in Athens.

References

External links

1977 births
Living people
Field hockey players from Berlin
German female field hockey players
Olympic field hockey players of Germany
Field hockey players at the 2004 Summer Olympics
Olympic gold medalists for Germany
Olympic medalists in field hockey
German people of Iranian descent
Medalists at the 2004 Summer Olympics
21st-century German women